Victoria Azarenka was the defending champion, but lost to Andrea Petkovic in the first round.

World No. 1 Serena Williams won the title, defeating Jelena Janković in the final, 6–2, 6–2.

Seeds

 Serena Williams (champion)
 Victoria Azarenka (first round)
 Agnieszka Radwańska (semifinals)
 Li Na (quarterfinals)
 Sara Errani (third round)
 Caroline Wozniacki (quarterfinals)
 Angelique Kerber (quarterfinals)
 Jelena Janković (final)
 Petra Kvitová (semifinals)
 Roberta Vinci (third round)
 Sloane Stephens (third round)
 Carla Suárez Navarro (third round)
 Sabine Lisicki (third round)
 Ana Ivanovic (second round)
 Samantha Stosur (first round)
 Simona Halep (first round)

The four Tokyo semifinalists received a bye into the second round. They were as follows:
  Angelique Kerber
  Petra Kvitová
  Venus Williams
  Caroline Wozniacki

Draw

Finals

Top half

Section 1

Section 2

Bottom half

Section 3

Section 4

Qualifying

Seeds

Qualifiers

Draw

First qualifier

Second qualifier

Third qualifier

Fourth qualifier

Fifth qualifier

Sixth qualifier

Seventh qualifier

Eighth qualifier

External links
 Main draw
 Qualifying draw

China Open - Singles